A list of films produced in Panama in year order.

1930s

1940s

1950s

1960s

1970s

1980s

1990s

2000s

2010s

2020s

References

External links
 Panama films (sorted by popularity ascending) at the Internet Movie Database

Panama

Films